This is a list of television serial dramas released by TVB in 2018, including highest-rated television dramas and award ceremonies.

Top ten drama series in ratings
The following is a list of TVB's top serial dramas in 2018 by viewership ratings. The recorded ratings include premiere week, final week, finale episode, and the average overall count of live Hong Kong viewers (in millions).

Awards

First line-up
These dramas air in Hong Kong from 8:00pm to 8:30pm, Monday to Friday on Jade.

Second line-up
These dramas air in Hong Kong from 8:30pm to 9:30pm, Monday to Friday on Jade.

Third line-up
These dramas air in Hong Kong from 9:30pm to 10:30pm, Monday to Friday on Jade.

Weekend dramas
These dramas air in Hong Kong from 8:30pm to 10:30pm, with two back-to-back episodes Sunday on Jade.

Starting in 30 July 2018 until 3 August 2018 from Monday thru Friday at 9:30 pm to 10:30 pm only on Jade.

Notes
Come with Me 性在有情; Released June 5, 2016. Copyright notice: 2016.

References

External links
TVB.com Official Website 

2018
2018 in Hong Kong television